GNPTG  (“N-acetylglucosamine-1-phosphate transferase, gamma subunit.”) is a gene in the human body. It is one of three genes that were found to correlate with stuttering.

Function

The GNPTG gene codes instructions for making the gamma subunit of an enzyme called GlcNAc-1-phosphotransferase (also called N-acetylglucosamine-1-phosphate transferase). This enzyme is made up of two alpha (α), two beta (β), and two gamma (γ) subunits. GNPTAB produces the alpha and beta subunits. GlcNAc-1-phosphotransferase functions to prepare newly made enzymes for lysosome transportation (lysosomal hydrolases to the lysosome). Lysosomes, a part of an animal cells, helps break down large molecules into smaller ones that can be reused. GlcNAc-1-phosphotransferase catalyzes the N-linked glycosylation of asparagine residues with a molecule called mannose-6-phosphate (M6P). M6P acts as indicator whether a hydrolase should be transported to the lysosome or not. Once a hydrolase has the indication from an M6P, it can be transported to a lysosome.

References

Genes on human chromosome 16